Klimovskaya is a rural locality (a village) in Mishutinskoye Rural Settlement, Vozhegodsky District, Vologda Oblast, Russia. The population was 13 as of 2002.

Geography 
The distance to Vozhega is 60 km, to Mishutinskaya is 6 km. Lukyanovskaya, Gorka, Pogorelka are the nearest rural localities.

References 

Rural localities in Vozhegodsky District